Satisfaction is an Australian television drama series which screened on the subscription television channel Showcase. It also screens in the Republic of Ireland on free-to-air channel TV3 and its sister channel 3e, and in New Zealand on free-to-air channel TV2 respectively.

The series was filmed in Melbourne, and was created by writer/producer Roger Simpson with producer Andy Walker and executive producer Kim Vecera. It centres on the lives and loves of a group of women who are sex workers in a high class brothel.

Production for the third season began in June 2009 and commenced screening in December 2009.

On 31 December 2010, it was revealed by TV Tonight that Satisfaction was officially cancelled, and that season 3 was the last season in production.

Synopsis
Satisfaction is set in and around '232', an up-market city brothel. The show is centred on five high class escorts and their manager as they juggle the pressures of their private lives with their profession. Chloe tells her 14-year-old daughter that she works in a casino, but realises that she will fairly soon learn the truth. Mel is being pursued by Nick, the owner of '232', whose daughter, Natalie, is the manager. Tippi, a beautiful and vivacious young blonde, is taking classes in creative writing. Heather, a dominatrix, is a lesbian whose partner, Ally, is desperate to have a baby. Lauren, an older woman who works as receptionist, is toying with the idea of moving away from the desk and becoming a sex worker.

Cast

Main

Recurring

Episodes

Reception
The series received very positive reviews from critics in Australia. The West Australian gave the show rave reviews, saying "the characters are fleshed out, the drama is feasible and the script is sophisticated enough to side-step the obvious clichés of the sex industry. While the setting and characters are glamorous and gorgeous, there are no Pretty Woman-style illusions about the job...". TV Tonight also thought the series was quite good, noting that "for all its empathy Satisfaction is like dipping your toes into a warm bath and sipping on the best champagne. It skews consciously toward the high end of prostitution to ample success. But like their wealthy clients, you’ll need to be a high-class customer of Foxtel to slip off your shoes first, an irony some programmers may have missed."

In 2014, an American series titled Satisfaction debuted. Although it shared a title with the Australian series, and also dealt with the topic of escorting, the series is not related to this one.

Awards and nominations

International broadcasters
After its 2008 Australian release, Satisfaction was sold to over 30 countries across the world:

See also
 List of Australian television series

References

External links
 

 
2007 Australian television series debuts
2010 Australian television series endings
APRA Award winners
Australian drama television series
Showcase (Australian TV channel) original programming
Television shows set in Victoria (Australia)
BDSM-related mass media